In Norse mythology, Víðbláinn is the third heaven in the cosmology of Snorri's Gylfaginning, located above Andlang and Asgard.  It will serve as a shelter and dwelling place for the souls of the dead during and after the destruction of Ragnarök.

Primary Source
Lindow, John   (2002)  Norse Mythology: A Guide to Gods, Heroes, Rituals, and Beliefs (Oxford University Press)

Related reading
Orchard, Andy (1997) Dictionary of Norse Myth and Legend (Cassell) 
Simek, Rudolf translated by Angela Hall (2007)  Dictionary of Northern Mythology (D.S. Brewer) 

Locations in Norse mythology
Conceptions of heaven